College Football on CBS Sports is the blanket title used for broadcasts of college football games that are produced by CBS Sports, for CBS and CBS Sports Network.

CBS has been a television partner with the Southeastern Conference (SEC) since 1996, when the network returned to carrying regular-season college football on a weekly basis during the season. CBS also televises the annual Army-Navy Game. Recently, CBS Sports Network has also begun televising college football from the Mid American Conference, Conference USA and Mountain West Conference, as well as home football games from Army, UConn and Navy. In 2019, CBS declined to renew its rights to SEC football, with the package ultimately going to the conference's main rightsholder ESPN beginning in 2024. CBS subsequently reached a deal to televise Big Ten football beginning in 2023, which will replace CBS's SEC package in its traditional timeslot beginning 2024. 

Televised games featuring teams inside the SEC are branded as The Home Depot SEC on CBS; all other televised football games on the main network are usually branded as The Home Depot College Football on CBS.

History
CBS has been televising college football games since it launched a sports division, and did so on a weekly basis during a period from the 1950s to 1966, when ABC gained exclusive rights to all NCAA regular season games. During that time period, CBS used Joe Hasel, Bob Neal, Mal Stevens, Jack Drees, Francis Wallace, Tom Harmon, and Gil Stratton as commentators. Drees was usually paired on commentary with Wallace on Midwest games, while Hasel and subsequently, Neal was paired with Stevens on Eastern regional games, and Harmon was paired with Stratton in games taking place on the West Coast. CBS was reduced to airing the Cotton Bowl Classic, which it had aired since 1958. It added the Sun Bowl in 1968, which continues to air on CBS as of 2022. From 1974 to 1977, it also aired the Fiesta Bowl, and from 1978 to 1986 it carried the Peach Bowl. CBSSN carried the Cure Bowl from 2015 to 2019. Since 2017, CBSSN has carried the Arizona Bowl, though COVID-19 issues led to the 2020 edition being aired on the main CBS network.

1982–1983
For the 1982 season, CBS was made an additional partner in the NCAA contract, and regular season coverage returned to the network. CBS and ABC would alternate the 12:30 and 3:30 p.m. slots from week to week during the seasons, carrying either a national game or several regional games in those frames, and also occasionally aired games in prime time, and on Black Friday. CBS broadcast games from every major conference, as well as the games of the then major independents such as Penn State (now a Big Ten member), Notre Dame (a temporary Atlantic Coast Conference (ACC) member in 2020 only) and Miami (now in the ACC).

Per the September 1, 1982, edition of the Elyria (OH) Chronicle Telegram and the September 1, 1982, edition of Sports Illustrated, ABC and CBS officials met with NCAA representatives and flipped a coin to determine "control dates". This allowed the network with priority on a particular date to have first choice when selecting the game it wished to air and whether it wanted the 12:00 ET or 3:30 ET timeslot. CBS won the first toss and thus earned first choice on seven dates: September 18, September 25, October 2, October 9, October 16, November 6, and November 20. ABC then got first pick on six dates, September 11, October 23, October 30, November 13, November 27, and December 4. ABC and CBS also had the right to take away a game from WTBS as long as it did so no later than the Monday before the game. WTBS was only able to show teams that had not been on national TV in 1981 and a maximum of four teams that had been on regional TV on two occasions.

As required by the NCAA, the network also televised Division I-AA, II and III games to very small audiences, giving teams such as The Citadel and Clarion State some television exposure (during the 1982 season, because of a player strike in the National Football League, these Division III contests aired nationwide). The pregame show was titled The NCAA Today in the vein of its pro football counterpart The NFL Today. Both shows were hosted by Brent Musburger. However, for the NCAA pregame show, Pat O'Brien and Ara Parseghian were the analysts/feature reporters, although Lesley Visser made occasional appearances on the show. Gary Bender was the lead play-by-play announcer for game coverage, working with analysts such as Pat Haden and Steve Davis. Other CBS game commentators were Verne Lundquist, Lindsey Nelson, Frank Herzog, Jack Snow and Dennis Franklin. This arrangement was in place during the 1982 and 1983 seasons.

Also during the 1982 NFL strike, CBS' NCAA football contract required the network to show four Division III games; the network initially intended to show those games on Saturday afternoons, with the broadcasts being received only in markets that were interested in carrying them. However, with no NFL games to show on October 3, 1982 (on what would have been Week 5 of the NFL season) due to the strike, CBS decided to show all of its NCAA Division III games on a single Sunday afternoon in front of a mass audience. CBS also used their regular NFL crews (Pat Summerall and John Madden at Wittenberg–Baldwin–Wallace, Tom Brookshier and Wayne Walker at West Georgia–Millsaps, Tim Ryan and Johnny Morris at Wisconsin–Oshkosh – Wisconsin–Stout, and Dick Stockton and Roger Staubach at San Diego–Occidental) and aired The NFL Today instead of using their regular college football broadcasters.

CBS originally wanted to air some Division I-A games on Sunday. However, according to Sports Illustrated, fellow NCAA football rights holders ABC and WTBS refused to sign off on the idea. Both networks demanded that CBS pay more in rights fees if it showed additional games. WTBS also objected to CBS moving games from Saturday to Sunday due to fears that such games would steal viewers from the NFLPA All-Star Games that WTBS planned to air. When the red tape made showing big time college football too difficult to pull off, CBS got the idea to run Division III games on that Sunday. It doesn't appear that CBS had plans to air any more games, however, since, Division III or not, it would have likely meant having to kick more money to the NCAA per ABC's and WTBS' demands.

1984–1990
In 1984, after the U.S. Supreme Court invalidated the NCAA contract in NCAA v. Board of Regents of the University of Oklahoma, and the University of Georgia, the College Football Association was formed to handle affairs between television networks and college football programs, the result was an exclusive contract with ABC that granted the network rights to all CFA partner conference games and the games of most major independents. However, the Big Ten and Pac-10 conferences were not included in this package, and signed their own agreement with CBS. Miami also reached an agreement for CBS to televise its most important home games, and in 1985, the Atlantic Coast Conference was added to CBS' list of college football properties. In 1985, Musburger took over the role of lead play-by-play voice, with Parseghian moving to the booth with him. Jim Nantz succeeded Musburger as studio host.

In 1987, CBS took over the CFA contract, which it would hold until 1990. CBS' tendency during this period was to air one marquee game each week, such as the legendary 1988 "Catholics vs Convicts" matchup between Notre Dame and Miami, though regional telecasts would occasionally be aired. For 1987 and 1988, Pat Haden joined Musburger in the booth, with John Dockery manning the sidelines. Nantz hosted what was now known as the "Prudential College Football Report", which was mostly a roundup of the day's scores and top headlines (including those in other sports), though sometimes key figures in the sport would be interviewed. Verne Lundquist, Tim Brant, Dick Stockton, Steve Zabriskie and Brad Nessler also called games for CBS during the CFA period. In 1989, Nantz became lead play-by-play announcer, but Haden remained the lead analyst for that year, being replaced by Brant in 1990. After 1990, ABC obtained exclusive network coverage of regular season college football, as it won back the CFA and retained the Pac-10/Big Ten rights.

1991–1994
As the 1990s began, CBS' Division I-A college football coverage was reduced to its bowl game contracts, which it had with the then-John Hancock (reverted to Sun Bowl in 1994), Cotton and the then-Blockbuster bowls. However, it lost the rights to the Cotton Bowl to NBC after the 1992 game, leaving the network with just two bowl games to round out its college football coverage. CBS televised Major League Baseball from 1990 to 1993, so as a result the network was not without major sports coverage on Saturdays during the fall after the loss of college football. In 1994 and 1995, after losing the MLB contract and its NFL contract, trying but failing to buy NHL rights, and still unable to secure a college football contract, CBS did not have any major sports coverage in the fall. (In desperation, the network began talks with the Canadian Football League, but nothing came of them.)

1995–1997
For 1995, CBS re-acquired the rights to the Cotton Bowl Classic and also gained rights to the Fiesta Bowl and the Orange Bowl from NBC. This was an important move for CBS as those two bowls would become part of the Bowl Alliance with the Sugar Bowl beginning that season; the goal was to try to guarantee an undisputed national champion in college football, something its predecessor the Bowl Coalition had also tried but did not fully succeed in doing.

Under the terms of the contract, which ran from 1995 through 1997, the Bowl Alliance games would be scheduled for New Year's Eve, New Year's Night, and January 2 with the last of the three serving as the national championship game. CBS would thus be guaranteed two national championship game matchups, with the Sugar Bowl airing on ABC.

CBS was the first network to air a Bowl Alliance national championship game, as Nebraska defeated Florida in the 1996 Fiesta Bowl (on the same token, CBS also aired the last Bowl Alliance national championship game, where Nebraska defeated Tennessee in the 1998 Orange Bowl to split that year's national championship vote as Michigan, which was No. 1 in both the AP and Coaches Polls going into the bowls, with the latter contractually obligated to name the Nebraska–Tennessee winner as the national champion, was obligated to play in that year's Rose Bowl). CBS also continued to air the Sun Bowl, but lost the rights to the Carquest Bowl after the game was moved from New Year's Day following the Orange Bowl's move to the home of the Carquest Bowl, Joe Robbie Stadium.

CBS resumed full-time college football coverage in 1996, as the network signed television contracts with the Big East Conference and Southeastern Conference (SEC) to be the exclusive national television home of their in-conference schedules. The coverage was originally branded "College Football on CBS", sponsored initially by NASDAQ, a tag it retains for non-SEC games broadcast on the network.

CBS also televised games featuring non-Big East or SEC teams during this time. As part of the contract signed in 1996, CBS succeeded ABC Sports as the television home of the Army-Navy Game.

1998–2019

CBS lost the rights to three of its bowl games following the 1997 season, as ABC gained the rights to the Orange and Fiesta Bowls as the exclusive television home of the newly formed Bowl Championship Series and Fox acquired the rights to the Cotton Bowl Classic. However beginning in 2001, CBS became the home of the SEC Championship Game, the rights to which had been retained by ABC following the SEC's move. Following the 2000 season, the Big East decided not to renew its contract with CBS and instead signed with ABC, leading to the telecasts taking on the SEC on CBS branding.

Today, CBS airs the top SEC weekly in-conference games as well as rivalry games with various other conferences when the SEC team is the home team. The network shares the rights to SEC conference games with the ESPN family of networks, which also airs the interconference rivalry games when the SEC team is not the home team (with the exception of Notre Dame), as well as all Pac-12/SEC regular season games.

On September 26, 1998, CBS planned to show UCLA @ Miami at noon, but this game was postponed due to Hurricane Georges. Sean McDonough and Terry Donahue were the scheduled announcers. In 2000, CBS installed Verne Lundquist on its No. 1 team following Sean McDonough's departure from CBS Sports. The events of September 11, 2001, resulted in postponements for games scheduled the weekend of September 15. The Tennessee-Florida game was rescheduled to December 1, which pushed the SEC title game one week later to December 8.

In 2005, CBS Sports Network, then operating as CSTV, signed a multi-year agreement to air select Conference USA football games. CBS Sports Network has aired the Conference USA Football Championship Game since 2018.

Until 2014, CBS maintained exclusivity during its 3:30 p.m. Eastern Time window. As part of an extension to CBS's contract with the SEC through the 2023–24 season, CBS no longer has exclusivity during its afternoon window, but still has the first choice of games. CBS is limited to airing five games featuring a particular team per season, and is allowed to air one game in primetime per season. In 2014, the Iron Bowl was given to ESPN in favor of the Egg Bowl, due to its potential effects on Mississippi State's participation in the College Football Playoff).

CBS aired the Gator Bowl from 2007 to 2010, its biggest bowl acquisition since the Orange and Fiesta Bowls. The Sun Bowl continues to air on CBS.

Before 2019, CBS had rights to three non-SEC regular season matchups, including the Army-Navy Game. CBS and NBC Sports split coverage of the annual matchup between Notre Dame and Navy, with CBS televising the game in years where Navy serves as the host team. CBS also added the Mountain West championship game to its coverage per a pre-existing contract that the network has with the conference (although most of the games air on CBS Sports Network); the game began in the last hour of primetime for the Eastern and Central time zones, meaning stations in those zones in most cases would not carry a late local newscast that evening. The Mountain West Championship Game was moved to ESPN networks beginning in 2015.

In 2011, in addition to Army–Navy, CBS also broadcast the other two service academy games: Navy-Air Force on October 1 and Army-Air Force on November 5, 2011 (a game which opened up as a result of CBS using its 8:00 p.m. game assignment for LSU-Alabama). Air Force's annual games vs. Army and Navy continue to air on CBS or CBS Sports Network.

In 2015, CBS Sports acquired the rights to 12 MAC football games through a sublicensing agreement with ESPN. In 2019, CBS Sports extended its contract with the MAC for four more years.

Verne Lundquist retired from his role as lead play-by-play commentator for CBS after the 2016 Army-Navy Game. Brad Nessler, formerly of ESPN, joined CBS as a secondary play-by-play announcer during the 2016 season, and officially replaced Lundquist on December 30, 2016, for CBS's coverage of the 2016 Sun Bowl.

After the 2020 season, CBS lost its alternating rights to the Navy-Notre Dame game to ESPN. The rights were bought as part of a new media rights contract signed between the network and the American Athletic Conference, which Navy has affiliated with for football since 2015.

2019–present 
On December 20, 2019, it was reported by Sports Business Journal that after having offered $300 million per-season, CBS had exited negotiations to renew its SEC package beyond the 2023 season. The network cited a need to "aggressively focus on other important strategic priorities moving forward". On December 10, 2020, ESPN announced that it had acquired the top SEC rights under a 10-year deal beginning in 2024, valued at $3 billion over the length of the contract. The games are slated to air on ABC, thus centralizing the entirety of the SEC's media rights with The Walt Disney Company.

On May 11, 2020, CBS Sports agreed to a multi-year deal through the 2023 season to become the home of UConn Huskies home games, which will mostly air on CBS Sports Network. 

In August 2022, it was reported that CBS Sports was nearing a deal for rights to Big Ten football under its next round of broadcast contracts, expanding upon its rights to cover Big Ten basketball. 

On August 18, 2022, CBS reached a seven-year deal to broadcast Big Ten football and basketball beginning in the 2023 season. CBS will air up to 15 Big Ten football games per-season, including a Friday afternoon game on Thanksgiving weekend, and the Big Ten Football Championship Game in 2024 and 2028. Big Ten games will replace the SEC on CBS's traditional 3:30 p.m. ET window beginning in the 2024 season; CBS is scheduled to carry seven Big Ten games in 2023, which will be scheduled around its final season of SEC coverage.

Theme music
The instrumental theme music for CBS's college football broadcasts was written by New York composer Lloyd Landesman, and has been used since the 1987 season. The theme music was originally used for CBS's broadcast of Super Bowl XXI on January 25, 1987, but it was later decided that the piece was better suited for college football than the National Football League. After CBS acquired the rights to air SEC games in 1996, the theme music became synonymous with that conference. In August 2022, news of CBS's intention to continue using the theme music for its Big Ten games spawned outbursts from upset SEC fans on Twitter.

Typical games
Typically only SEC on CBS games, select Mountain West games featuring Boise State, games involving the Commander-in-Chief's Trophy (Army-Navy, Army-Air Force, and Air Force-Navy) and the Sun Bowl air on CBS with all other games airing on CBS Sports Network.

The games aired as part of the SEC package are the premiere SEC matchups of the week. Since 1996, Alabama has had the most appearances with 122 of their games broadcast by CBS, followed by Florida with 109, Georgia with 88, LSU with 81, and Tennessee with 73. The ESPN family of networks get the subsequent picks of games among the SEC's national television partners. Since 2001, the SEC Championship Game has been televised by CBS.

The Vanderbilt Commodores have appeared on the CBS package only six times, with a 2013 game against Georgia (a 31–27 victory) marking their first appearance since 2001, and the first Vanderbilt home game televised by the network since 1982. Before their remarkable 2014 season, when they appeared four times (including the first Egg Bowl ever broadcast by CBS), Mississippi State had only seven CBS games as part of the package.

During the regular season, typical games that are shown almost every year include Florida–Tennessee (1996–2011, 2013, 2015–2017, 2020, and 2022), Florida–Georgia (all but 2002), Auburn–Alabama (the Iron Bowl) (since 2000, except for 2003, 2007 and 2014), LSU–Alabama (except for 2021 and 2022), Florida–LSU (1999, 2001, 2003, 2005–2009, 2011–2013, and 2017–2018), LSU–Ole Miss (2003, 2007–2010, 2012, 2015, and 2021) and LSU–Arkansas (1996–2013, except 2009), which was traditionally aired the day after Thanksgiving. The Arkansas–Missouri game is now aired the Friday after Thanksgiving, since Texas A&M has replaced Arkansas as the final opponent on LSU's schedule.

In addition, the interconference rivalry games, Florida–Florida State, South Carolina–Clemson, Georgia–Georgia Tech and (since 2014) Kentucky–Louisville, occasionally air on the network when the SEC schools host the games and they fall into SEC television contracts (otherwise, those games air on ABC or the ESPN networks, as the ACC's contracts dictate). When the interconference rivalries air on CBS, the broadcasts are generally branded as "College Football on CBS" instead of "SEC on CBS". In addition, CBS will occasionally televise games where SEC schools host marquee non-conference opponents, such as the Miami Hurricanes and Notre Dame Fighting Irish.

CBS Sports Network airs weekly games from the Mid-American Conference, C-USA and Mountain West, as well as all UConn home games and select Army and Navy home games. CBSSN also airs the Conference USA Football Championship Game and the Hula Bowl yearly.

Team records
1996 through December 10, 2022 – does not include bowl games

Note: 1 One Penn State win over Pittsburgh was vacated (later restored) following the NCAA investigation into the Jerry Sandusky case.

Notable personalities

Current

Play-by-play
 Brad Nessler: lead play-by-play (2017–present), No. 2 play-by-play (2016)
 Tom McCarthy: No. 2 play-by-play (2022-present)
 Rich Waltz: lead Mountain West Conference play-by-play
 Jason Knapp: lead Army play-by-play, No. 2 Mountain West Conference play-by-play (2019–2021)
 John Sadak: lead Navy play-by-play
 Chick Hernandez: No.2 Navy play-by-play (2021–present)
 Ed Cohen: fill-in play-by-play (2013–present)
 Chris Lewis: fill-in play-by-play (2021–present)
 Dave Ryan: fill-in play-by-play (2012–present)
 Alex Del Barrio: fill-in play-by-play (2020–present)
 Chris Hassel: fill-in play-by-play (2017–present)
 Michael Grady: fill-in play-by-play (2018–present)
 Meghan McPeak: lead UConn play-by-play (2022—present)
 Carter Blackburn: fill-in play-by-play (2022—present), lead Mountain West Conference play-by-play (2014—2020), No. 2 play-by-play (2014-2015; 2017—2020)

Color analysts
 Gary Danielson: lead color analyst (1983; 2006–present)
 Rick Neuheisel: No. 2 color analyst (2017–present)
 Aaron Taylor: lead Mountain West Conference color analyst (2013–present); No. 2 color analyst (2013-2017)
 Ross Tucker: lead Army color analyst (2015–present)
 Randy Cross: lead Navy color analyst (2009–present)
 Christian Fauria: lead UConn color analyst (2022-present)
 Tom Herman: color analyst (2022-present)
 Robert Turbin: color analyst (2022-present)
 Donte Whitner: color analyst (2021-present)

Sideline reporters
 Jenny Dell: (2015–present, No. 1 since 2022, No. 2 2015-2016)
 Sherree Burress: (2021–present, Southeastern Conference games only)
 Amanda Guerra: (2019–present)
 Brandon Baylor: (2021-present)
 Justin Walters: (2019–present)

Studio
 Adam Zucker: host (2014–present), fill-in host (2011–2013)
 Brian Jones: analyst (2013–present)
 Rick Neuheisel: analyst (2015–present)
 Houston Nutt: fill-in analyst (2017–present)
 Gene Steratore: rules analyst (2019–present)

Former

Play-by-play
 Gary Bender (1982–1983; 1984–1986)
 Craig Bolerjack (1999–2010)
 Tim Brando (1997; 2011–2013)
 Don Criqui (2008)
 Dick Enberg (2001)
 Frank Herzog (1982–83)
 Gus Johnson (1996–1997)
 Verne Lundquist (1982–1988); lead play-by-play (2000–2016)
 Sean McDonough lead play-by-play (1990–1999)
 Brent Musburger (1984–1988)
 Jim Nantz (1989–1990; 1996)
 Lindsey Nelson (1962–63; 1982–83)
 Tim Ryan (1996)
 Noah Eagle: No. 2 play-by-play (2021)
 Jason Horowitz: lead Army play-by-play

Color commentary
 Trev Alberts (2008)
 Todd Blackledge: lead color analyst (1999–2005)
 Dean Blevins (2000–2001)
 Tim Brant
 Terry Brennan (1962–63)
 Steve Beuerlein (2006–2010; 2012)
 Ed Cunningham (1997–1999)
 Steve Davis (1982–1985; 1996 Cotton Bowl)
 Terry Donahue (1996–1998)
 Dan Fouts (2008)
 Dennis Franklin (1982–83)
 Pat Haden (1982–83; 1987–90)
 Craig James (2002)
 Dan Jiggetts
 Mike Mayock (1996–1999)
 Jack Snow (1982–1983)
 Scott Hunter (1983)
 Dan Dierdorf (2001 Army-Navy Game)
 Boomer Esiason (multiple Army-Navy Games)
 Aaron Murray: co-No. 2 color analyst (2019–2021); No.2 Mountain West Conference color analyst (2021)

Sideline reporters
 Jill Arrington (lead, 2000–2003)
 John Dockery
 Mike Joy (1990 & 1991 Sun Bowl)
 Sam Ryan
 Lewis Johnson (2011)
 Allie LaForce (lead, 2014–2017)
 Otis Livingston (2011)
 Tracy Wolfson (lead, 2004–2013)
 John Schriffen: (2017–2019)
 Jamie Erdahl: (2018–2021)
 Lindsay Rhodes: (2021)

Studio hosts
 Tim Brando (1998–2013)
 Greg Gumbel (1989)
 Andrea Joyce (1990)
 Brent Musburger (1982–1983)
 Jim Nantz (1985–1988; 1997)
 Pat O'Brien (1984; 1995–1996)

Studio analysts
 Spencer Tillman (1999–2014)
 Ara Parseghian (1982–1989)
 Mike Francesa (1990)
 Boomer Esiason (1995)
 Butch Davis (1995)
 Craig James (1996–1998)
 Lou Holtz (1997–1998)
 Archie Manning (2005–2013)

Features
 College Football: The Drive to Atlanta presented by Mercedes-Benz (pregame show aired at 2:30 pm. Eastern Time)
 State Farm College Football Today (main pre-game show aired at 3:00 pm. Eastern Time and simulcast on CBS Sports Network prior to their 3:30 p.m. college game)
 Starting Lineups presented by Chick-fil-A
 Ford Update (throughout the game)
 Nissan Heisman Watch (throughout the game)
 Geico Halftime Report (formerly sponsored by EarthLink until 2004)
 Preview of Sunday's NFL on CBS matchups
 First Half Trends Presented by Enterprise Rent-a-Car (at the start of second half)
 Aflac Trivia Question
 The Home Depot Tools for Success
 Geico Game Recap (formerly showed only scoring plays until 2008 as the "Scoring Recap")
 Quicken Loans Scholar Athlete (formerly sponsored by Red Lobster until 2016)
 DirecTV Player of the Game
 NAPA Auto Parts Play of the Game (formerly named the "Wrangler 5-Star Play of the Game")
 College Football Post-game Show presented by Rocket Mortgage (formerly sponsored by Jeep until 2016, and by Dodge until 2018)
 Verizon Red Zone

In addition, CBS Sports Network aired the hour-long SEC Post-Game Show Presented by Geico at 7:00 pm. Eastern Time, featuring the wrap-up of the CBS SEC game.

Nielsen ratings

Regular season

Conference championships

Bowl Games

References

External links
 NCAA Football – CBS Sports.com
 secsports.com

1958 American television series debuts
1960s American television series
1970s American television series
1980s American television series
1990s American television series
2000s American television series
2010s American television series
2020s American television series
CBS original programming
CBS Sports
Sports telecast series
CBS